Hackelia amethystina is a species of flowering plant in the borage family known by the common name amethyst stickseed.

Distribution
The plant is endemic to northern California.

In the Sierra it is often mistaken in flower for Hackelia nervosa.

Description
Hackelia amethystina is a densely hairy perennial herb 40 to 80 centimeters tall. The leaves around the base of the stem may be up to 30 centimeters long and there are generally several smaller leaves along the stem.

The inflorescence is an array of coils of flowers. Each flower is just over a centimeter wide with blue to pinkish lobes with white appendages at the bases. The fruit is a cluster of prickly nutlets.

External links
Calflora Database: Hackelia amethystina (Amethyst stickseed)
Jepson Manual eFlora (TJM2) treatment of Hackelia amethystina
UC CalPhotos gallery

amethystina
Endemic flora of California
Flora of the Sierra Nevada (United States)
Natural history of the California Coast Ranges
Natural history of Plumas County, California
Flora without expected TNC conservation status